Webology is an international peer-reviewed academic journal in English devoted to the field of the World Wide Web and serves as a forum for discussion and experimentation. It was established in 2004. It serves as a forum for new research in information dissemination and communication processes in general, and in the context of the World Wide Web in particular. Concerns include the production, gathering, recording, processing, storing, representing, sharing, transmitting, retrieving, distribution, and dissemination of information, as well as its social and cultural impacts. There is a strong emphasis on the Web and new information technologies. Special topic issues are also often seen.

The founding editor was Dr. Alireza Noruzi. He is a university scholar and received his Ph.D. from Aix-Marseille University, France. From 2010 to 2011, he was a post-doctoral research fellow at Universite de Montreal, Ecole de bibliotheconomie et des sciences de l'information. He also received his B.A. and M.A. degrees in Library and Information Science in 1998 and 2001 respectively.

Abstracting and indexing
This journal is indexed by the following services:
 Scopus: Elsevier Bibliographic Databases 2006-2021 (discontinued)
 ProQuest 
 EBSCO 
 LISA: Library & Information Science Abstracts  
 DOAJ - Directory of Open Access Journals (discontinued)
 Open J-Gate
 FRANCIS (discontinued)
 Web Citation Index
 Academic Journals Database
 China Education Publications Import & Export Corporation (CEPIEC)

References

External links 

Information science journals
Publications established in 2004
Biannual journals
English-language journals
Academic journals of Iran